Madonna University is the first  Catholic university in Nigeria. It was accredited by National Universities Commission. Madonna University Nigeria has three campuses that are located in Elele - Rivers State, Okija - Anambra State and Akpugo - Enugu State. The campuses have different Faculties with Departments. The Okija campus in Anambra state has the following Faculties: Management and Social Sciences; Arts and Education, and  Law.  The Elele campus has Faculties of Medicine and Surgery, Pharmacology. The Akpugo campus has Faculty of Engineering. These campuses have their main libraries as well as libraries attached to Faculties and the Departments. The university graduates first class, second class and third class students.  The university also has a postgraduate program and part-time program that runs on Fridays and Saturdays.

History
Founded on 10 May 1999 in Okija, Anambra State, it was established by Father Edeh. Edeh had founded Our Saviour Institute of Science and Technology in Enugu the previous year. In 2004, under the approval of the National Universities Commission (NUC), Madonna University's main campus was moved to Elele in Rivers State.

Description
The university offers various courses including Law, Management, Natural Sciences, Social Sciences, Medicine, Pharmacy and Engineering. The courses are accredited by the National Universities Commission, and the admission requirements are a minimum of 5 credits at not more than two sittings of the O-level schools Certificate Examination.

The Elele campus has a University Teaching Hospital which is located a few kilometer away from the other campus at Okija.

Campuses
Madonna university has Three campuses, Elele Campus, Okija campus and Akpugo campus.
Elele campus consists of medical related courses Medicine, Medical laboratory science, Pharmacy, Optometry, Nursing, Natural sciences etc. 
Okija campus being the home for Departments of Law, Accounting, Banking and Finance, Business administration, Entrepreneurship, International Relations, Political science, Library and Information Science. Akpugo campus in Enugu State, has the following Departments - Chemical Engineering, Mechanical Engineering, Civil Engineering, Electrical and Electronics Engineering and Petroleum  Engineering.

Academic activities 
Madonna University Nigeria offers different academic activities. These include Matriculation, Convocation and Scholastic activities. There are also National Universities Commission (NUC) activities for approval of departments, resource verifications and libraries. Other academic activities include, induction of students and graduates in various fields of learning. For instance, the Pharmacists Council Of Nigeria (PCN) inducted 236 fresh pharmacy graduands of Madonna University. The Matriculation activity is done in every campus, every year after admission of new students. But Convocation is usually done collectively in Elele campus, which is the mother campus and the Headquarter where the seat of administration is located in Rivers state.

Library 
This is the academic library located in Madonna University Nigeria to offer resources and access to information to the students and members of the academic environment. In the Madonna University Nigeria, there are libraries in the three campuses in Okija, Elele and Akpugo. There are faculty libraries and departmental libraries.  In other words, every department in Madonna University library Nigeria has departmental ICT laboratories manned by a library assistant to enable equitable learning and supports. 

The university library in Okija Campus has an ICT section with resources and facilities that are made available and accessible to the students.  The resources in the university library include both print and non-print resources. The electronic information resources include e-journals, e-books, e-newspapers, online directories, e-projects, and databases.  The facilities include computers, hard disks, printers, scanners, photocopier, projector, land area network, wide area network and generators. 

However, there are still issues with the provision of facilities, automation of the library, good regular internet, regular power supply, searching skills of the students and adequacy of the computer.

References

Catholic universities and colleges in Rivers State
Educational institutions established in 1999
Catholic universities and colleges in Nigeria
1999 establishments in Nigeria